Asota clara is a species of noctuoid moth in the family Erebidae first described by Arthur Gardiner Butler in 1875. It is found in Indonesia, Peninsula Malaysia and Myanmar.

The wingspan is 54–58 mm.

Subspecies
Asota clara clara (Indonesia)
Asota clara donatana (Indonesia, Peninsula Malaysia, Myanmar)

References

Moths of Asia
Moths described in 1875